The 1910 New Orleans Pelicans season was a season in professional baseball. The Pelicans played in the Southern Association and won their second league pennant. One sportswriter ranked them as the greatest sports team in the history of New Orleans. The team was owned and managed by Charlie Frank.

Shoeless Joe Jackson was a member of the team. Jackson had previously played for the Philadelphia Athletics of the American League, and owner Connie Mack sent him on loan to the Pelicans for the 1910 season. Jackson had a .354 batting average for New Orleans to win his third minor league batting title. He also led the league with 82 runs scored, 165 hits, and 19 triples, and he was praised for "his sweet swing and effortless skills in the outfield." This was Jackson's only season with the Pelicans. Later that year, he returned to the American League with the Cleveland Naps and batted .387 in 20 games.

Hank Butcher, George Rohe, and John W. Weimer tied for the league lead in home runs with 4 each. The team's pitchers were Ted Breitenstein, Otto Hess, Bert Maxwell, and Pat Paige. Hess had a 25–9 record, leading one writer to call the Pelicans a "two-man team" between Hess and Jackson. Paige went 24–14, and Breitenstein went 19–9.

The team coasted to an 8-game lead in the standings. After clinching the pennant, New Orleans defeated the Atlanta Crackers, and "a brass band played between innings, and twice during the game snacks of pretzels and sauerkraut were delivered onto the field, where play was halted so the athletes could snack."

Standings

Sources:

Player statistics

Batting 
Note: G = Games played; AB = At bats; H = Hits; Avg. = Batting average

Source:

Pitching 
Note: G = Games pitched; W = Wins; L = Losses; Pct. = Winning percentage

Source:

References

1910 in sports in Louisiana
New Orleans Pelicans (baseball)